Konnur is a municipal council in the Belagavi District of Karnataka, India.

Demographics
 India census, Konnur had a population of 27,474. Males constitute 51% of the population and females 49%. Konnur has an average literacy rate of 60%, higher than the national average of 59.5%: male literacy is 70%, and female literacy is 49%. In Konnur, 13% of the population is under 6 years of age.

References

Cities and towns in Belagavi district